Bhinneka Tunggal Ika is the official national motto of Indonesia, inscribed in the National emblem of Indonesia, the Garuda Pancasila, written on the scroll gripped by the Garuda's claws. The phrase comes from the Old Javanese, translated to as "Unity in Diversity." The phrase is also mentioned in the Constitution of Indonesia, specifically in article 36A. The motto refers to the unity and integrity of Indonesia, a nation consisting of various cultures, regional languages, races, ethnicities, religions, and beliefs.

The phrase is a quotation from an Old Javanese poem Kakawin Sutasoma, written by Mpu Tantular, a famous poet of Javanese Literature during the reign of the Majapahit empire sometime in the 14th century, under the reign of King Rājasanagara, also known as Hayam Wuruk.

Meaning
Translated word for word, bhinnêka is a sandhi form of bhinna "different" and ika; the word tunggal means "one", the word ika means "it". Literally, Bhinneka Tunggal Ika is translated as "It is different, [yet] it is one". Conventionally, the phrase is translated as "Unity in Diversity", which means that despite being diverse, the Indonesian people are still one unit. This motto is used to describe the unity and integrity of the Nation and the Unitary State of the Republic of Indonesia which consists of various cultures, regional languages, races, ethnicities, religions, and beliefs. As head of the Faculty of Philosophy of Gadjah Mada University, Rizal Mustansyir, writes, "the motto of Bhinneka Tunggal Ika explains clearly that there is diversity in various aspects of life that makes the Indonesian nation a unified and unified nation."

History

Origins 
The phrase originated from the Old Javanese poem Kakawin Sutasoma, written by Mpu Tantular, a famous poet of Javanese Literature during the reign of the Majapahit empire sometime in the 14th century, under the reign of King Rājasanagara, also known as Hayam Wuruk. The Kakawin contains epic poems written in metres. The poem is notable as it promotes tolerance between Hindus (especially Shivaites) and Buddhists.

Adoption 
The phrase Bhinneka Tunggal Ika was published in an article entitled Verspreide Geschriften which was written by a Dutch linguist orientalist Johan Hendrik Casper Kern. Kern's writings were later read by Mohammad Yamin, who then brought the phrase to the first Investigating Committee for Preparatory Work for Independence (BPUPK) session, between 29 May to 1 June 1945.

The motto Bhinneka Tunggal Ika was later incorporated into the state emblem, the Garuda Pancasila. Reporting from the Directorate General of Culture of the Republic of Indonesia, the state symbol was designed by Sultan Hamid II and announced to the public on 15 February 1950.

The phrase, along with Pancasila as national emblem and 20 other articles, is officially included into the Constitution of Indonesia after the second amendment of the constitution was ratified on People's Consultative Assembly (MPR) parliamentary session in 7–18 August 2000.

Full stanza

Original
This quotation comes from canto 139, stanza 5. The full stanza reads as follows:

Rwâneka dhâtu winuwus Buddha Wiswa,
Bhinnêki rakwa ring apan kena parwanosen,
Mangka ng Jinatwa kalawan Siwatatwa tunggal,
Bhinnêka tunggal ika tan hana dharma mangrwa.

Translation
It is said that the well-known Buddha and Shiva are two different substances.
They are indeed different, yet how is it possible to recognise their difference in a glance,
since the truth of Jina (Buddha) and the truth of Shiva is one.
They are indeed different, but they are of the same kind, as there is no duality in Truth.

This translation is based, with minor adaptations, on the critical text edition by Soewito Santoso.

Other sources 
This idea is a constant theme throughout Mpu Tantular's writings and can also be found in his other writing, the Kakawin Arjunawijaya, verse 27.2:

Original
'ndan kantenanya, haji, tan hana bheda san hyan
hyan Buddha rakwa kalawan Siwariijadewa
kiilih samgka sira san pinakeşţi dharma
rin dharma Sima tuwi yan lepas adwit'i,ya'

Translation
Clearly then, your Majesty, there is no distinction between the Deities: 
the god Buddha and Siwa, the lord of gods. 
Both are the same: they are the tutelary deities of the dharma; 
in the dharma sima as well as in the dharma lepas they are second to none.

See also

 National motto
 National emblem of Indonesia
 The 2018 Asian Games' official mascots, Bhin Bhin, Atung, and Kaka, which are named after the motto.

References

National symbols of Indonesia
Indonesian culture
Kakawin
National mottos
Javanese culture
Buddhism and Hinduism